Max Dane Kaley ( November 22, 1924 - September 30, 2016) is an American former politician and judge. He served in the Georgia House of Representatives from 1977 to 1980  as a Democrat.

References

2016 deaths
1924 births
Democratic Party members of the Georgia House of Representatives
Place of birth missing
Georgia (U.S. state) lawyers
20th-century American lawyers